Mount Siple is a potentially active Antarctic shield volcano, rising to  and dominating the northwest part of Siple Island, which is separated from the Bakutis Coast, Marie Byrd Land, by the Getz Ice Shelf. Its youthful appearance strongly suggests that it last erupted in the Holocene. It is capped by a  summit caldera, and tuff cones lie on the lower flanks. Recely Bluff is on the northeast slope of the mountain, about 7 nautical miles (13 km) from the peak.

Mount Siple is named after Paul A. Siple (1908–68), a US Antarctic explorer and geographer who took part in six Antarctic expeditions, including the two Byrd expeditions of 1928-30 and 1933-35 (Siple Coast, Siple Island). He was in command of the West Base of the US Antarctic Service (USAS), 1939–41, and was navigator on all major exploratory flights from the base, including the flight on which Mount Siple was discovered.

According to peaklist.org, the volcano was probably climbed, but there is no evidence of this and the summit may have been landed on by helicopter. 

The volcano was visited in February 2017 as part of the Swiss Polar Institute's Antarctic Circumnavigation Expedition. Al Jazeera English Science and Technology editor Tarek Bazley was on board and filed a news report on his visit to a colony of Adele penguins breeding there.

See also
List of volcanoes in Antarctica
List of Ultras of Antarctica
List of islands by highest point

References

External links
Mount Siple at skimountaineer.com
"Mount Siple, Antarctica" on Peakbagger

Polygenetic shield volcanoes
Calderas of Antarctica
Volcanoes of Marie Byrd Land
Potentially active volcanoes